Meneclia is a monotypic moth genus in the subfamily Arctiinae. Its single species, Meneclia pallidula, is found in Namibia. Both the genus and species were first described by Karl Grünberg in 1910.

References

Endemic fauna of Namibia
Lithosiini